Orson Rehearsed is a 2021 American independent film by Daron Hagen about Orson Welles which combines elements of opera film, documentary film, and Surrealist cinema. The narrative follows a 2018 staged production of Hagen's eleventh opera integrating extensive pre-shot films and electro-acoustic tracks in which, poised in the bardo between life and death on the night of his demise, Welles takes stock of his life. Directed by Hagen based on his own screenplay and musical score, the film was produced by Burning Sled Media and the Chicago College of Performing Arts. It stars Robert Orth, Robert Frankenberry, and Omar Mulero as Welles, and features the Fifth House Ensemble.

Hagen began the screenplay in 2016 as a collection of 52 dramatic beats featuring Welles and Marlene Dietrich, John Houseman, Paola Mori, Rita Hayworth, and Marc Blitzstein set to original music by Hagen and words fashioned by Hagen from William Shakespeare and Welles' own public domain comments. Conceived simultaneously as a live operas (in various dramaturgical configurations) and a film that is an artwork in itself that folds the live performance into a larger vision, in spring 2018 Hagen pared down the 52 beats to 14 which centered on the character of Welles divided into three avatars—one young, one middle aged, and one on the night of his death.

During 2016–17, Hagen shot and edited three sets of 14 60-minute films for projection over the heads of the onstage Orsons in live performance. Hagen directed the staged premiere of Orson Rehearsed at the Studebaker Theatre in the Fine Arts Building (Chicago) in September 2018 in a staging designed to work in the theater but also to provide the shots mapped out in the 2016 storyboards. From 2018-2020, he edited the musical soundtrack and folded the onstage films into footage of the staged premiere while adding another layer of semi-opaque images carrying a narrative unique to the film.

The film was released on February 2, 2021, although a traditional art release has been delayed because of COVID-19, it has received substantial positive attention at film festivals worldwide, receiving laurels for Best Musical Score, Best Composer, Best Director, and Best Editing.

Plot

10 October 1985. Hollywood, California. Orson Welles' heart has just stopped. We enter his mind in this moment, on the threshold between life and death. In the liminal zone between life and death, Welles' thoughts flow as a stream of consciousness that loops back on itself, like a Möbius strip. Those thoughts are articulated by three avatars: the first represents the past, the memory of his youthful wunderkind self; the second represents his vestigial self-image as a swashbuckling mid-career artist, bemused to be crumpled on the floor in his bathrobe, dying; the last, represents his spirit, out of time—what Heidegger called an ecstace. On its face, the audience is presented with a series of essays about how opera and film overlap. The relationship between a man and the roles that he has played is examined—Falstaff, Othello, Brutus, Ahab, Kane, Quinlin (from Touch of Evil), and himself.

In stream of consciousness dramatic beats, he first surveys his relationship to the works of Shakespeare, then revisits the accidental drowning of Manoel Olimpio Meira during the filming of It's All True. He contemplates the sound of his own heart; and then lashes out, reliving the pain of his repeated loss of creative control in the editing of The Magnificent Ambersons. He recalls Marc Blitzstein at the piano the night that The Cradle Will Rock debuted before rolling into a rollicking remembrance of the high-octane life he led, reliving the giddy joy of careening across Manhattan in a rented ambulance (to better cut through traffic) at the top of his game on his way from a Danton's Death rehearsal to the War of the Worlds radio broadcast.

His thoughts turn to his despair at the recutting of Touch of Evil, which he repurposes in imagination as the realization that he is dying. He thinks back a few hours to his appearance that afternoon on The Merv Griffin Show, imagining himself as a manic marionette dancing for others’ amusement—the humiliation in having started at the top with Citizen Kane and having ended up doing wine commercials. He contemplates the solitary nature of existence before recalling his eighth birthday—the last time that he saw his mother. He asserts that his life's greatest mistake was that, when his mother asked him to make a wish before blowing out the candles on his birthday cake, he forgot.

He repurposes Shakespeare's great Falstaff credo as he mulls over Chimes at Midnight and the role of love: Maybe I did forget, he closes, poignantly, before having a vision of Rita Hayworth and singing a tender paean to domesticity and fatherhood. A passionate social activist, Welles' last thoughts are of the future: with the foresight available only to the dead, he mourns his country as the words of a xenophobic reality television president are intercut with Emma Lazarus' hymn to liberty. But the body gives out even though the spirit is still willing: it is no longer Welles' problem, it is ours. The avatars join together in a secular hymn: Our songs will all be silenced, they sing, but what of it? Go on singing. Go on. Go. And he does. We do.

Cast
 Omar Mulero as Orson Welles #1
 Robert Frankenberry as Orson Welles #2
 Robert Orth as Orson Welles #3

Music
The soundtrack documents what audience members heard seated in the theater during the live performance of the score. Accordingly, the extensive electro-acoustic tracks crafted by Hagen are blended with the singers and the live instruments onstage performed by the Fifth House Ensemble. This stable soundscape was very lightly enhanced during post-production mastering, and the film edited to the soundtrack. The Naxos Records May 2021 release represents a hybrid of cast and soundtrack recording sound worlds.

Reception
Fanfare magazine noted, "Hagen's ability to meld a multiplicity of expressive devices into a coherent, expressive, and convincing whole is magnificent. Linking passages between scenes, to underline the dream-like stream of consciousness, are masterly, transitions seamless." "The collage of ragtime, synth effects and post-romantic arioso engages," admits Steph Power in a two-star review, while David Denton writes, "Do please hear Orson Rehearsed as a major contribution to 21st century music theatre." [A] "dramatically compelling one-acter ... [set] in a compelling sound world," wrote Kevin Filipsky. "This kind of approach with the potential to overwhelm an opera's subject and its audience. But the combination of Orson Rehearseds brevity and Hagen's unerring sense of pacing wins the day. The cumulative effect is of a very individual, fascinating, and thought-provoking view of a life that was as influential as it was flawed." American Record Guide noted, "I found this to be a thoroughly enjoyable opera ... in a highly dramatic idiom."

Awards

References

External links
 
 
 Orson Rehearsed Naxos product page''
 2019 WILDSound Film Festival Podcast interview with Daron Hagen about "Orson Rehearsed"

English-language operas
Operas by Daron Hagen
Operas set in the United States
Operas set in the 20th century
Opera films
Operas
2021 independent films
2020s English-language films